David Dragojević (born 7 September 1988) is a Serbian former footballer who played as a defender.

Club career
Born in Novi Sad, Dragojević started his career playing with Obilić Zmajevo for several seasons. He was also loaned to Metalac Futog for a half-season. Later he spent a period with Veternik between 2011 and 2012.

Dragojević joined Proleter Novi Sad for the 2012–13 season. For the first season in the club, he made 20 Serbian First League appearances with 6 starts. He also played a cup match against Partizan. In the next season, 2013–14 he made 11 league appearances and noted 1 cup match, against Red Star Belgrade. After missing some period because of an injury, Dragojević returned to the squad for the spring half of the 2014–15 season. He also made 10 league and 1 cup appearances during the first half of 2015–16 season, but later he went abroad and missed the rest of the season.

Career statistics

References

External links
 

1995 births
Living people
Footballers from Novi Sad
Association football defenders
Serbian footballers
FK Veternik players
FK Proleter Novi Sad players
Serbian First League players
Parovi